C. K. Rajan (May 1933 – 11 November 2000) was an Indian politician and leader of Communist Party of India. He represented Irinjalakuda constituency in the 3rd Kerala Legislative Assembly.

References

Communist Party of India politicians from Kerala